The Vas County Assembly is the local legislative body of Vas County in the Western Transdanubia, in Hungary.

Composition

2019
The Assembly elected at the 2019 local government elections, is made up of 15 counselors, with the following party composition:

|-
|colspan=8 align=center| 
|-
! colspan="2" | Party
! Votes
! %
! +/-
! Seats 
! +/-
! Seats %
|-
| bgcolor=| 
| align=left | Fidesz–KDNP
| align=right| 48,167
| align=right| 61.58
| align=right| 3.75
| align=right| 11
| align=right| 1
| align=right| 73.34
|-
| bgcolor=| 
| align=left | Jobbik
| align=right| 7,811
| align=right| 9.99
| align=right| 6.38
| align=right| 1
| align=right| 1
| align=right| 6.67
|-
| bgcolor=| 
| align=left | Momentum Movement (Momentum)
| align=right| 5,874
| align=right| 7.51
| align=right| 
| align=right| 1
| align=right| 1
| align=right| 6.67
|-
| bgcolor=| 
| align=left | Democratic Coalition (DK)
| align=right| 5,730
| align=right| 7.33
| align=right| 3.59
| align=right| 1
| align=right| 1
| align=right| 6.67
|-
| bgcolor=| 
| align=left | Hungarian Socialist Party (MSZP)
| align=right| 5,411
| align=right| 6.92
| align=right| 7.96
| align=right| 1
| align=right| 1
| align=right| 6.67
|-
! colspan=8|
|-
| bgcolor=#318CE7| 
| align=left | Mayors Association for Vas County (PVME)
| align=right| 3,131
| align=right| 4.00
| align=right| 3.19
| align=right| 0
| align=right| 1
| align=right| 0
|-
| bgcolor=| 
| align=left | Everybody's Hungary Movement (MMM)
| align=right| 2,098
| align=right| 2.68
| align=right| 
| align=right| 0
| align=right| ±0
| align=right| 0
|-
! align=right colspan=2| Total
! align=right| 80,686
! align=right| 100.0
! align=right| 
! align=right| 15
! align=right| 0
! align=right| 
|-
! align=right colspan=2| Voter turnout
! align=right| 
! align=right| 55.30
! align=right| 6.75
! align=right| 
! align=right| 
! align=right| 
|}

After the elections in 2019, the Assembly controlled by the Fidesz–KDNP party alliance which has 11 councillors, versus 1 Jobbik, 1 Momentum Movement, 1 Democratic Coalition (DK) and 1 Hungarian Socialist Party (MSZP) councillors.

List of seat winners

2014
The Assembly elected at the 2014 local government elections, is made up of 15 counselors, with the following party composition:

|-
! colspan="2" | Party
! Votes
! %
! +/-
! Seats 
! +/-
! Seats %
|-
| bgcolor=| 
| align=left | Fidesz–KDNP
| align=right| 40,402
| align=right| 57.83
| align=right| 7.18
| align=right| 10
| align=right| 1
| align=right| 66.67
|-
| bgcolor=| 
| align=left | Jobbik
| align=right| 11,433
| align=right| 16.37
| align=right| 6.28
| align=right| 2
| align=right| 1
| align=right| 13.33
|-
| bgcolor=| 
| align=left | Hungarian Socialist Party (MSZP)
| align=right| 10,395
| align=right| 14.88
| align=right| 2.23
| align=right| 2
| align=right| 0
| align=right| 13.33
|-
| bgcolor=#318CE7| 
| align=left | Mayors Association for Vas County (PVME)
| align=right| 5,021
| align=right| 7.19
| align=right| 
| align=right| 1
| align=right| 1
| align=right| 6.67
|-
! colspan=8|
|-
| bgcolor=| 
| align=left | Democratic Coalition (DK)
| align=right| 2,610
| align=right| 3.74
| align=right| 
| align=right| 0
| align=right| ±0
| align=right| 0
|-
! align=right colspan=2| Total
! align=right| 72,222
! align=right| 100.0
! align=right| 
! align=right| 15
! align=right| 0
! align=right| 
|-
! align=right colspan=2| Voter turnout
! align=right| 
! align=right| 48.55
! align=right| 5.98
! align=right| 
! align=right| 
! align=right| 
|}

2010
The Assembly elected at the 2010 local government elections, is made up of 15 counselors, with the following party composition:

|-
! colspan="2" | Party
! Votes
! %
! +/-
! Seats 
! +/-
! Seats %
|-
| bgcolor=| 
| align=left | Fidesz–KDNP
| align=right| 51,563
| align=right| 65.01
| align=right| .
| align=right| 11
| align=right| 14
| align=right| 73.34
|-
| bgcolor=| 
| align=left | Hungarian Socialist Party (MSZP)
| align=right| 13,569
| align=right| 17.11
| align=right| .
| align=right| 2
| align=right| 9
| align=right| 13.33
|-
| bgcolor=| 
| align=left | Jobbik
| align=right| 8,004
| align=right| 10.09
| align=right| 
| align=right| 1
| align=right| 1
| align=right| 6.67
|-
| bgcolor=#808080| 
| align=left | Solidarity (Szolidaritás)
| align=right| 6,182
| align=right| 7.79
| align=right| 
| align=right| 1
| align=right| 1
| align=right| 6.67
|-
! align=right colspan=2| Total
! align=right| 81,938
! align=right| 100.0
! align=right| 
! align=right| 15
! align=right| 25
! align=right| 
|-
! align=right colspan=2| Voter turnout
! align=right| 
! align=right| 54.53
! align=right| 
! align=right| 
! align=right| 
! align=right| 
|}

Presidents of the Assembly
So far, the presidents of the Vas County Assembly have been:

 1990–1998 Gábor Zongor, Hungarian Socialist Party (MSZP)
 1998–2006 Péter Markó, Fidesz–MDF-MKDSZ
 2006–2014 Ferenc Kovács, Fidesz–KDNP
 since 2014 László Majthényi, Fidesz–KDNP

References

Vas
Vas County